Pasveh (also Romanized as Pasevh and Pasooh; also known as Qal‘eh Paswah and Qal‘eh-ye Pasveh) is a village in Lahijan-e Sharqi Rural District of Lajan District of Piranshahr County, West Azerbaijan province, Iran.

At the 2006 National Census, its population was 2,977 in 515 households. The following census in 2011 counted 3,777 people in 795 households. The latest census in 2016 showed a population of 3,495 people in 869 households; it was the largest village in its rural district. Pasveh has a strategic location controlling the "easy" pass between the Lahijan district, in the Lesser Zab headwaters, and the Lake Urmia basin.

According to Vladimir Minorsky, Pasveh represents the name and location of the ancient Parsua kingdom. He explained the difference in name by saying that r-deletion in consonant clusters is well-attested. Pasveh was a frontier outpost near the Parsua's southern border (their core territory was probably the fertile Solduz district further north).

In the early 1200s, Yaqut al-Hamawi visited Pasveh and left a description in his works. A century later, Hamdallah Mustawfi included an entry for it (here spelled Basavā or Pasavā) in his Nuzhat al-Qulub. He described it as a small town in the tuman of Maragheh whose surrounding agricultural district produced grain, grapes, and some other fruits; he said its tax value was assessed at 25,000 dinars. Pasveh later features in the accounts of Kurdish tribal feuds in the Sharafnama. Much later, when Minorsky visited Pasveh in 1911, he described it as a "desolate" town with a "dilapidated" fort.

References 

Piranshahr County

Populated places in West Azerbaijan Province

Populated places in Piranshahr County